Quincy Coleman (born May 23, 1975 in Macon, Mississippi) is a former gridiron football defensive back in the National Football League and the Canadian Football League. He played college football for Jackson State University. 

He was signed by the Edmonton Eskimos on November 10, 2001; re-signed by Edmonton on March 8, 2004. He was released in March 2005. Signed with the Ottawa Renegades as a free agent on April 7, 2005.

In 2005 Coleman recorded 46 tackles, five pass knockdowns, one fumble recovery and one interception in his first season with the Renegades. He also played for the Chicago Enforcers of the XFL.

External links
Just Sports Stats
CFL profile
NFL profile

1975 births
Living people
American football defensive backs
American players of Canadian football
Canadian football defensive backs
Chicago Bears players
Edmonton Elks players
Frankfurt Galaxy players
Jackson State Tigers football players
Ottawa Renegades players
Chicago Enforcers players
People from Macon, Mississippi